Valheim is an upcoming survival and sandbox video game by the Swedish developer Iron Gate Studio and published by Coffee Stain Studios. It was released in early access on 2 February 2021 for Linux and Windows via Steam, and for Xbox One and Xbox Series X/S on 14 March 2023. The game was developed by a five-person team, building on development work which Richard Svensson had undertaken as a side project in his spare time. Since its early access release, Valheim has achieved both critical and commercial success, being praised as a ″rare exception″ of a refined early access game. A month after its release, it had sold over five million copies and was one of the most played games on Steam.

Setting and plot 
Valheim takes place in a world where slain Vikings go to prove themselves fit for the halls of Valhalla. As one such, the player begins with nothing and soon discovers that to reach the Norse afterlife, they must defeat the evils that stalk Valheim.  Led only by their instincts and occasional hints from a raven, the player must prepare to fight the sworn enemies of Odin himself.

The term "Valheim" denotes a fictional tenth world within the world tree Yggdrasil of Norse mythology.

Gameplay 
Valheim is an open-world survival game played from a third-person perspective. As fallen Vikings, players must craft tools, build shelters and fight enemies to survive. The game uses distinctive low-resolution stylized 3D graphics, with a combat system inspired by action games. Co-operative gameplay with up to ten people and optional PvP gameplay is also supported.

After creating their Viking character, players can create a world that is procedurally generated from a map seed. Each world is split into several biomes, such as meadows, the Black Forest, swamps, mountains, plains, oceans, the Mistlands, the Deep North, and the Ashlands. Each biome has its own unique enemies, items, and bosses that change how difficult it is to survive there. Valheim operates on an in-game day and night cycle.

To survive, players must gather natural resources found throughout the world, either through foraging, hunting, mining, or farming. These resources are used to build shelters, make tools and equipment, and forge weapons. Players have a health bar (which depletes from enemy attacks or taking large falls), as well as a stamina bar that drains as players perform actions like running and attacking. To replenish either bar, players can eat food. This can not only restore health and stamina, but can also temporarily increase how much of each the player has, depending on the variation and quality of the food that is eaten.

In addition, the game utilizes a skill-level system that ranges from blocking to running. Each skill can be increased up to a level of 100 and has different effects on the game mechanics. For example, the spears skill will determine the damage the player can do with spears, while the running skill will determine how stamina is drained while sprinting.

The main objective of the game is to kill the six bosses located in different biomes of the game. To summon each boss, players must travel to each boss' altar and give a specific item as an offering. Bosses will drop a collectable trophy when killed; this trophy can be placed at a central altar to grant each player a special power-up. Power-ups can be used infinitely, but the player needs to wait for a brief period between uses.

Combat makes use of one- and two-handed weapons, shields, bows, spears. Players can travel through the different biomes either by foot or on crafted boats, which range from rafts to different types of Viking longships.

Development 
Valheim is developed by Iron Gate Studio, a small Swedish game development studio formed during the game's production. Studio co-founders Richard Svensson and Henrik Tornqvist were both coworkers at a local game development company called Pieces Interactive. Before Valheim, Svensson had previously begun development on a simulation game called Tolroko in his spare time. However, this game was ultimately unreleased; according to Tornqvist, Svensson realized that it was "redundant to implement simulation systems for their own sake, rather than for the player".  With his next game, Svensson wanted to make an open-world experience where its simulations improved the player's experience.

Svensson began working on Valheim in 2017 under the working title of Fejd (Swedish for "feud"). He ended up leaving Pieces Interactive in 2018 to work on Valheim full time, and convinced Tornqvist to join him later that year. The game was released into alpha in June 2018 and officially released into early access on 2 February 2021, with no full release date announced so far.

Continued support for the game is planned, and it involves the expansion of unfinished biomes, as well as improvements to fundamental game mechanics. Iron Gate Studio updated the game on 16 September 2021 with the "Hearth & Home" update. This update brought general improvements to the game and introduced new food, weapons, and build options.

In December 2022, Iron Gate released the "Mistlands" update for Valheim. The update added a new biome (the Mistlands), along with a large quantity of new content. This content included enemies, neutral NPCs, random events, items, food, building parts, the sixth main boss, crafting stations, weapons, and a few other miscellaneous features. The update also saw the addition of a magic system (and four magic weapons to go with it).

During the Xbox Games Showcase 2022 Extended on 14 June, it was announced that Valheim would be coming to Windows 10 via Microsoft Store in Q3 2022, and later in Q2 2023 to Xbox One and Xbox Series X/S consoles. These versions, developed by external studios Piktiv and Fishlabs, will support cross-platform play and launch directly into Xbox Game Pass. Meanwhile, Iron Gate Studio will focus on the "core Valheim experience and its next major update milestones". In February 2023, it was announced that the game would release on the consoles on 14 March 2023.

Reception 

Valheim has received positive reviews from critics. IGN Nordic gave the game a rating of 9/10, stating that the game has "excellent art and music highlighting a world that generates endless exciting stories". PC Gamer called Valheim a "rare exception" for early access games, as well as stating that the game "feels refined and satisfying as it is right now". The Washington Post appreciated that Valheim did not elaborate on certain gameplay and story elements, allowing its fans to build a sense of community with each other by sharing things like design ideas and theories about the game's lore.

A month after its release, it had sold five million copies and was one of the most-played games on Steam. It sold over 10 million copies on Steam by July 2022.

Awards and accolades
Valheim was nominated for Best Debut Indie Game and Best Multiplayer Game at The Game Awards 2021. The game was named the Game of the Year for 2021 by PC Gamer. Later, Valheim won the Best Debut and Audience Award at the Game Developer's Choice 2022.

Soundtrack 

Valheim (Original Game Soundtrack) was released 29 October 2021, by Iron Gate AB, to stream on Spotify and for purchase on Steam.

Track listing 
All music credited to Patrik Jarlestam except where noted.

Personnel 
 Patrik Jarlestam – composer, guitars, bass, percussion
 Philippa Murphy-Haste – clarinet, viola
 Jenean Lee – cello
 Michael H. Dixon – French horn
 Kinsey Alexander-Swatton – Flute, alto flute

Notes

References

External links 
 

Coffee Stain Studios games
Early access video games
Game Developers Choice Award winners
Linux games
Multiplayer and single-player video games
Open-world video games
Survival video games
Indie video games
Video games featuring protagonists of selectable gender
Upcoming video games scheduled for 2023
Video games developed in Sweden
Video games based on Norse mythology
Video games set in the Viking Age
Windows games
Xbox One games
Xbox Series X and Series S games